The 1998 Southern Conference baseball tournament was held at Joseph P. Riley Jr. Park in Charleston, South Carolina, from April 30 through May 3. Second seeded The Citadel won the tournament and earned the Southern Conference's automatic bid to the 1998 NCAA Division I baseball tournament. It was the Bulldogs fourth tournament win

The tournament used a double-elimination format. Only the top eight teams participated, so VMI and Appalachian State were not in the field. 1998 was the first season with UNC Greensboro and Wofford in the league, having joined the conference in the previous offseason.

Seeding

Bracket

All-Tournament Team

References 

Tournament
Southern Conference Baseball Tournament
Southern Conference baseball tournament
Southern Conference baseball tournament
Southern Conference baseball tournament